Never Say Quit is a lost 1919 American silent comedy film directed by Edward Dillon. It was produced and distributed by the Fox Film Corporation.

Plot
As described in a film magazine, Reginald Jones (Walsh) is a jinx and is always getting stung. One of his stunts is to butt in when he sees a woman being ill-treated, and in one adventure is decoyed into a badger game. As a consequence, he loses a fortune when he is unable to attend the funeral of an aunt. He goes to sea on a schooner and the passengers include a rich man and his daughter, who are treasure seekers. The captain is rough and pulls a stunt to get the rich man into his power. Reginald comes to their aid, but it's a tough situation until American sailors from submarine chaser S.C. 143 come to the rescue, jumping the railing and knocking out the villainous crew.

Cast
George Walsh as Reginald Jones  
Florence Dixon as Helen Lattimore    
Henry Hallam as Professor Lattimore     
William Frederic as Ship Captain 
Frank Jacobs as Shipmate
Joseph W. Smiley as Uncle Reginald (as Joe Smiley) 
Jean Acker as Vamp 
Joseph P. Mack as Undetermined Role (as Joseph Mack)

See also
1937 Fox vault fire

References

External links

 
 

1919 films
American silent feature films
Fox Film films
American black-and-white films
1919 comedy films
Silent American comedy films
Lost American films
1919 lost films
Lost comedy films
Films directed by Edward Dillon
1910s American films